Christophe Bruncher (born March 24) is a French film producer.

Filmography
 2021: Women Do Cry, Mina Mileva & Vesela Kazakova - (producer)
 2019: Cat In The Wall, Mina Mileva & Vesela Kazakova - (co-producer)
 2016: Paris Prestige, Hamé Bourokba & Ekoué Labitey from La Rumeur - (co-producer)
 2016: Mr. Stein Goes Online, Stéphane Robelin - (producer)
 2011: And If We All Lived Together, Stéphane Robelin - (producer)
 2007: Charly, Isild Le Besco - (producer)
 2006: L'intouchable, Benoît Jacquot, (executive producer, producer)

Awards
 2006: Mostra de Venise, L'intouchable

Sources

External links
 
 

Living people
French film producers
Year of birth missing (living people)